Robert C. Byrd High School is a public school in Clarksburg, West Virginia.

The school, which serves grades 9-12, is a part of Harrison County Schools.

The school serves a vast majority of the city of Clarksburg, West Virginia, along with the towns of Nutter Fort, West Virginia and Stonewood, West Virginia. It is one of six public high schools in Harrison County. The school opened in 1996 as a consolidation of Washington Irving High School, which is now Washington Irving Middle School, and Roosevelt-Wilson High School. The student enrollment (as of 2008-09) is 880. The principal is Steve Gibson. The school's colors are Royal Blue and Kelly Green, and their mascot is the eagle.

The school's namesake is U.S. Senator Robert Byrd, who served from 1959 to 2010.

References

Public high schools in West Virginia
Schools in Harrison County, West Virginia